The Associação de Futebol de Castelo Branco (Castelo Branco Football Association) is one of the 22 District Football Associations that are affiliated to the Portuguese Football Federation. The AF Castelo Branco administers lower tier football in the district of Castelo Branco.

Background 
Associação de Futebol de Castelo Branco, commonly referred to as AF Castelo Branco, is the governing body for football in the district of Castelo Branco which covers the 11 municipalities of Belmonte, Castelo Branco, Covilhã, Fundão, Idanha-a-Nova, Oleiros, Penamacor, Proença-a-Nova, Sertã, Vila de Rei and Vila Velha de Ródão. The Football Association is based in Castelo Branco. The Association's President is Jorge Manuel Farinha Nunes.

The organisation was established on 22 March 1936 and the early clubs included:

Associação Académica Albicastrense
Associação Humanitária dos Bombeiros Voluntários de Castelo Branco
Clube de Futebol "Os Albicastrenses"
Clube de Futebol "Os Covilhanenses"
Desportivo Operário Covilhanense
Onze Vermelho Albicastrense
Sport Tortosendo e Benfica
Sporting Clube de Castelo Branco
Sporting Clube da Covilhã
Sporting Clube do Fundão

Out of the 10 founding clubs, six no longer exist. Sporting Clube da Covilhã has been the most successful and has competed in the national division.

Notable clubs in the Castelo Branco FA
 Sporting Covilhã — only Castelo Branco club to compete in Primeira Liga
 Benfica de Castelo Branco
 Sertanense
 G.D. Vitória de Sernache

2013–14 season
The AF Castelo Branco runs the following division covering the fourth tier of the Portuguese football league system.

1ª Divisão
Associação Cultural e Recreativa de Atalaia do Campo
Associação Desportiva e Cultural de Pedrogão de S. Pedro
Associação Desportiva e Cultural de Proença-A-Nova
Associação Desportiva Estação
Associação Recreativa e Cultural de Oleiros
Centro Desportivo Recreativo e Cultural de Vila Velha de Rodão
Clube Académico do Fundão
Clube Desportivo de Alcains
Grupo Desportivo Teixosense
Grupo Desportivo Vitória de Sernache
União Desportiva de Belmonte

Former participants
Other clubs that have competed in the Distritais since the 1992/93 season include:

Associação Cultural e Desportiva de Ferro
Associação Cultural e Desportiva dos Amigos da Meimoa
Associação Cultural e Recreativa Juncalense
Associação Cultural Recreativa Desportiva do Cabeçudo
Associação Desportiva Cultural Recreativa Amigos Soalheira
Associação Desportiva do Fundão
Associação Desportiva Penamacorense
Associação Recreativa e Cultural Aldeia Nova Cabo
Carvalhense Futebol Clube
Centro Cultural Desportivo Recreativo Colmeal da Torre
Centro Cultural e Desportivo Estrela do Zézere (Boidobra)
Centro Cultural Recreativo Salgueiro do Campo
Centro Desportivo Universitário da Beira Interior
Centro Popular de Cultura e Desporto de Lardosa
Clube Desportivo de Póvoa de Rio de Moínhos
Clube Desportivo e Recreativo de Escalos de Cima
Clube Recreativo de Aldeia do Souto

Clube União Idanhense
Desportivo de Castelo Branco
Futebol Clube Estrela de Unhais da Serra
Grupo Desportivo Águias de Moradal
Grupo Desportivo Águias do Canhoso
Grupo Desportivo Cultural Silvares
Grupo Desportivo e Cultural dos Três Povos
Grupo Desportivo Recreativo e Cultural Escalos de Baixo
Grupo Desportivo Recreativo e Cultural Orvalho
Grupo Desportivo Vales Rio
Grupo Desportivo Valverde
Industria Futebol Clube Cebolense
Paúl Cultural Desportivo
Sport Clube do Barco
Sport Clube São Vicente da Beira
União Desportiva Cariense
União Lousense
Vilarregense Futebol Clube

District Championships

Historic champions

Titles
 Sporting da Covilhã - 11

Recent divisional winners

See also
 Portuguese District Football Associations
 Portuguese football competitions
 List of football clubs in Portugal

References 

Castelo Branco

Sports organizations established in 1936
Sport in Castelo Branco, Portugal